Takuan Group is a volcanic group located in the southern part of Bougainville Island, Papua New Guinea. It consists of three closely spaced stratovolcanoes, Mount Takuan being the highest of them.

See also
 List of volcanoes in Papua New Guinea

References 
 

Mountains of Papua New Guinea
Volcanoes of Bougainville Island
Stratovolcanoes of Papua New Guinea
Volcanic groups
Complex volcanoes